Russell Alan Cobb (born 18 May 1961) is an English former cricketer who played more than one-hundred and fifty matches for Leicestershire and Northern Transvaal across a career than ran from 1980 until 1989. A right-handed batsman, he scored over 4,000 runs across the first-class and List A formats, though he never made a century. He also bowled left-arm medium pace and slow left-arm spin bowling, though only very occasionally. His son, Josh Cobb, also played for Leicestershire.

References

External links
 

1961 births
People from Leicester
Leicestershire cricketers
Northerns cricketers
English cricketers
Living people
English cricket coaches